Paris By Night 80: Tết Khắp Mọi Nhà (Lunar New Year Among Every House) is a Paris By Night program produced by Thúy Nga that was filmed at Studio 40 of the Canadian Broadcasting Centre in Toronto, Canada on October 29, 2005.

Concept

The program is a part of "Thúy Nga Tết Quadrilogy" to celebrate Lunar New Year.  The other seven programs are Paris by Night 76: Xuân Tha Hương, Paris by Night 85: Xuân Trong Kỷ Niệm, Paris by Night 101: Hạnh Phúc Đầu Năm, Paris By Night 110: Phát Lộc Đầu Năm, Paris By Night 113: Mừng Tuổi Mẹ, Paris By Night 124: Anh Cho Em Mùa Xuân, Paris By Night 131: Xuân Hy Vọng and Paris By Night 132: Xuân Với Đời Sống Mới.

Track list

Disc 1

01. Introduction: Múa Lân

02. Xuân Quê Ta (Nhật Trung) - Như Quỳnh, Tâm Đoan, Lương Tùng Quang & Thế Sơn

03. Mưa Xuân (Đức Thịnh) - Minh Tuyết

04. Nhớ Một Chiều Xuân (Nguyễn Văn Đông) - Trần Thái Hòa

05. Xuân Về Trên Môi Em (Huỳnh Nhật Tân) - Bảo Hân, Như Loan & Tú Quyên

06. Tâm Sự Ngày Xuân (Hoài An) - Tâm Đoan

07. Mừng Tuổi Mẹ (Trần Long Ẩn) - Quang Lê

08. Cánh Bướm Vườn Xuân (Nhạc Ngoại Quốc, Lời Việt: Phạm Duy) - Hồ Lệ Thu

09. Rước Xuân Về Nhà (Nhật Ngân) - Ngọc Liên

10. Chuyện Ngày Cuối Năm (Song Ngọc) - Trường Vũ

11. Hài Kịch: Thà Ăn Mày Hơn Ăn Cướp (Nhóm Kịch Thúy Nga) - Hoài Linh & Trang Thanh Lan

12. Liên Khúc:
Mùa Xuân Ơi (Nguyễn Ngọc Thiện)
Ngày Tết Quê Em (Tú Huy)
- Bé Xuân Mai

13. Tân Cổ: Cánh Thiệp Đầu Xuân (Nhạc và Lời: Minh Kỳ & Lê Dinh) - Hương Lan

14. Mùa Xuân Lá Khô (Trần Thiện Thanh) - Mạnh Quỳnh

Disc 2

15. Mộng Chiều Xuân (Ngọc Bích) (MTV) - Loan Châu

16. Đoản Xuân Ca (Thanh Sơn) - Hương Thủy

17. Mai Lệ Xuân (Song Ngọc & Hoài Linh) - Thế Sơn

18. Tình Em Mùa Xuân (Trường Huy) - Nhật Trung & La Sương Sương

19. Xuân Mong Chờ (Lời Việt: Minh Châu) - Như Quỳnh

20. Hài Kịch: Lương Sơn Bá, Chúc Anh Đài (Nhóm Kịch Thúy Nga) - Hoài Linh, Chí Tài & Bé Tí

21. Mùa Xuân Trở Về (Võ Thiện Thanh) - Lương Tùng Quang & Bảo Hân

22. Mùa Xuân Đang Đến (Quốc Hùng) - Lưu Bích

23. Em Là Xuân Về (Bảo Chấn) - Thủy Tiên

24. Hãy Mang Đến Những Mùa Xuân (Nguyễn Đức Trung) - Nguyễn Hưng

25. Lắng Nghe Mùa Xuân Về (Dương Thu) - Bằng Kiều

26. Dáng Xuân (Minh Châu) - Dương Triệu Vũ

27. Liên Khúc:
Xuân Vui Ca (Nguyễn Hiền)
Chúc Mừng Xuân (Thanh Sơn)
- Bảo Hân, Như Loan, Hồ Lệ Thu, Minh Tuyết, La Sương Sương, Tâm Đoan, Ngọc Liên & Tú Quyên

BONUS

Bonus Song: Lie Under My Bed (Adam Hồ) (MTV)  - Adam Hồ 

 Behind The Scenes (Hậu Trường Sân Khấu)

Paris by Night

vi:Paris By Night 80